Prabhsukhan Singh Gill (born 2 January 2001) is an Indian professional footballer who plays as a goalkeeper for Indian Super League club Kerala Blasters and the India national team.

Club career

Early and youth career
Born in Ludhiana, Punjab, Gill began his career with the Chandigarh Football Academy after a recommendation to scouts by his brother, Gursimrat Singh Gill. He later joined the AIFF Elite Academy after he participated in a trial to be part of the India under-17 side which would take part in the FIFA U-17 World Cup.

After the FIFA U-17 World Cup concluded, Gill was selected to be part of the Indian Arrows, a developmental side owned by the All India Football Federation which was to play in the I-League. He appeared on the bench in the Arrow's first match of the season on 29 November 2017 against Chennai City, being the back-up to Dheeraj Singh Moirangthem. On 2 January 2018, Gill's 17th birthday, he made his professional debut for the Indian Arrows against East Bengal due to Moirangthem leaving the club. He gave up two goals early in the match as Indian Arrows fell 2–0. Arrows Head Coach Luís Norton de Matos was impressed with Gill's performance saying "I think it is a new process for goalkeeper Gill who is 16 years old. He made a fantastic save in the second half. The team needs to protect the goalie."

Bengaluru FC
He was signed by Bengaluru in 2019. He made two appearances for the club which includes a match against Paro FC in the AFC Cup Qualifier.

Kerala Blasters

2021–22 season: Debut season and ISL Golden Glove 
On 9 September 2020, Kerala Blasters announced the signing of Gill on a two-year deal. During his first season with the club, Gill did not made any appearances in the Super League as he was used as a back-up keeper for Albino Gomes. He finally made his Blasters debut on 21 September 2021 against Delhi FC in the Durand Cup, which they lost 1–0. He made his league debut on 5 December in the 2–1 victory over Odisha FC, where he was substituted in for Albino Gomes, after Albino was contracted with an injury. Gill then became the first choice keeper for  the Blasters as Albino was ruled out of action for an indefinite period of time. On 12 December, he started for the Blasters in ISL for the first time in the next match against SC East Bengal in a 1–1 draw. Gill kept his first clean-sheet on 19 December against the defending champions Mumbai City FC in a 0–3 victory. He kept a clean-sheet again on 22 December in the next match against rivals Chennaiyin FC, which they won 0–3, repeating the same feat of the previous matchday. Gill had his first clean-sheet of the year 2022 in their match against SC East Bengal on 14 February, which they won with a score of 1–0 at full-time. His performance in the month of February earned him the ISL's 'Emerging Player of the Month' award. Gill was awarded with the Golden Glove of the 2021–22 Indian Super League season. In twenty matches played, he managed to keep seven clean sheets, made 47 saves and conceded 21 goals. This was the best goalkeeping performance by a Kerala Blasters goalkeeper in the last five years.

2022–23 season: Contract extension 
After a good individual season, the Kerala Blasters announced that Gill had signed a two-year contract with the club till 2024. On 19 November, Gill kept his 9th clean sheet for the Blasters in a 1–0 away win against Hyderabad FC and surpassed Sandip Nandy to become the all-time highest clean-sheet holder for the club.

International career

While a member of the Chandigarh Football Academy, Gill had a trial with the India under-17 side which was to take part in the 2017 FIFA U-17 World Cup in India. The trial was successful and Gill joined the team and the AIFF Elite Academy. On 21 September 2017, Gill was announced to be part of the 21-man side that would participate in the FIFA U-17 World Cup. He would be the number 2 goalkeeper for the side, behind Dheeraj Singh Moirangthem, during the U-17 World Cup.

On 26 October 2017, after the FIFA U-17 World Cup, Gill was selected to be part of the India under-20 side for the 2018 AFC U-19 Championship qualifiers. On 6 August 2018, India U20 national team defeated the six time world champions Argentina under-20 by 2–1 where Gill's two saves during the fifty sixth and sixty first minutes was crucial in deciding the match.

In March 2022, Gill was called up for the senior national squad by coach Igor Štimac ahead of India's two friendly matches against Bahrain and Belarus.

Personal life
His elder brother Gursimrat Singh Gill is also a professional footballer who plays as a defender for ATK Mohun Bagan FC. Both the Gill brothers played together for Bengaluru FC during the 2019-20 season.

Career statistics

Honours 

Kerala Blasters
 Indian Super League runner up: 2021–22

Individual
 Indian Super League Golden Glove: 2021–22

References

External links
Indian Super League Profile

2001 births
Living people
Sportspeople from Ludhiana
Indian footballers
AIFF Elite Academy players
Indian Arrows players
Bengaluru FC players
Association football goalkeepers
Footballers from Punjab, India
I-League players
India youth international footballers
Kerala Blasters FC players
Indian Super League players